Pietro Pariati (Reggio Emilia, 27 March 1665- Vienna, 14 October 1733) was an Italian poet and librettist. He was initially secretary to Rinaldo d'Este (1655–1737), Duke of Modena. Then from 1699 to 1714, he made his living as a poet in Venice, initially writing librettos with Apostolo Zeno, then independently. Then finally from 1714-1729 he was Metastasio's predecessor at the Vienna court of Charles VI, Holy Roman Emperor.

Librettos
Apart from many oratorio librettos, his most popular opera librettos included:
Flavio Anicio Olibrio (with Zeno, 1708), set by Gasparini, Porpora and Jommelli
Astarto (with Zeno, 1708), set by Albinoni and Caldara
Sesostri re di Egitto (1710), set by Gasparini and Galuppi
Il Giustino (after Beregan, 1711), set by Albinoni, Vivaldi and Händel
Costantino (1711), set by Gasparini and Lotti/Caldara
Teseo in Creta (1715), set by Porpora, Händel and Galuppi
 Orfeo ed Euridice (1715), set by Johann Joseph Fux
 Don Chisciotte in Sierra Morena (with Zeno, 1719), set by Conti and Holzbauer

References

A. Zeno, Poesie drammatiche (Venezia, 1744)
N. Campanini, Un precursore del Metastasio (Reggio Emilia, 1889)
O. Wessely, Pietro Pariatis Libretto zu Johann Joseph Fuxens ‘Costanza e fortezza’ (Graz, 1969)
G. Gronda, ‘Per una ricognizione dei libretti di Pietro Pariati’, Civiltà teatrale e Settecento emiliano: Reggio nell’Emilia, pp. 115–36 (1985)
E. Kanduth, Das Libretto im Zeichen der Arcadia, Paradigmatisches in den Musikdramen Zenos (Pariatis) und Metastasios, Opern als Text: Romanistische Beiträge zur Libretto-Forschung, pp. 33–53 (Heidelberg, 1986)
G. Gronda, La carriera di un librettista: Pietro Pariati da Reggio di Lombardia (Bologna, 1990)
R. Bossard, Von San Luca nach Covent Garden: die Wege des Giustino zu Händel, Göttinger Händel-Beiträge, vol. IV, pp. 146–73 (1991)
G. Gronda, La Betulia liberata e la tradizione viennese dei componimenti sacri, Mozart, Padova e la ‘Betulia liberata’, pp. 27–42 (Padova, 1989)
L. Bianconi, G. La Face Bianconi, I libretti italiani di Georg Friedrich Händel e le loro fonti (Florence, 1992)
B. Brumana, Figure di Don Chisciotte nell’opera italiana tra Seicento e Settecento, Europäische Mythen der Neuzeit: Faust und Don Juan, pp. 699–712 (Salzburg, 1992)
A. Sommer-Mathis, Von Barcelona nach Wien: die Einrichtung des musik- und Theaterbetriebes am Wiener Hof durch Kaiser Karl VI, Musica Conservata: Günther Brosche zum 60. Beburtstag, pp. 355–80 (Tutzing, 1999)

Italian opera librettists
1665 births
1733 deaths
People from Reggio Emilia
Italian male dramatists and playwrights